Rachel Cusk (born 8 February 1967) is a British novelist and writer.

Childhood and education
Cusk was born in Saskatoon to British parents in 1967, the second of four children with an older sister and two younger brothers, and spent much of her early childhood in Los Angeles. She moved to her parents' native Britain in 1974, settling in Bury St Edmunds, Suffolk. She comes from a wealthy Catholic family, and was educated at St Mary's Convent in Cambridge. She studied English at New College, Oxford.

Career
Cusk has written eleven novels, four works of non-fiction, and adapted Medea for the London theatre Almeida.

She published her first novel, Saving Agnes in 1993 which received the Whitbread First Novel Award. Its themes of femininity and social satire remained central to her work over the next decade. In responding to the formal problems of the novel representing female experience, she began to work in non-fiction. She has published two autobiographical accounts of motherhood and divorce: A Life's Work and Aftermath. Cusk has been a professor of creative writing at Kingston University.

Cusk's 2014 novel, Outline, was shortlisted for the Folio Prize, the Goldsmiths Prize and the Baileys Women's Prize for Fiction. In 2003, Cusk was nominated by Granta magazine as one of 20 'Best of Young British Novelists'.

After a long period of consideration, Cusk began working in a new form that represented personal experience while avoiding the politics of subjectivity and literalism and remaining free from narrative convention. That project became a trilogy (Outline, Transit, and Kudos). Judith Thurman in The New Yorker wrote: "Many experimental writers have rejected the mechanics of storytelling, but Cusk has found a way to do so without sacrificing its tension." The novel, giving fiction a radical "new design". Outline was one of The New York Timess top 5 novels of 2015.

Reviewing Outline in The New York Times, Heidi Julavits wrote: "While the narrator is rarely alone, reading Outline mimics the sensation of being underwater, of being separated from other people by a substance denser than air. But there is nothing blurry or muted about Cusk's literary vision or her prose: Spend much time with this novel and you'll become convinced she is one of the smartest writers alive."

Reviewing her novel, Transit, critic Helen Dunmore writing for The Guardian commended Cusk's "brilliant, insightful prose", adding, "Cusk is now working on a level that makes it very surprising that she has not yet won a major literary prize".

In The New York Times review of Transit, Dwight Garner said the novel offers "transcendental reflections", and that he was waiting more eagerly for Kudos, the last novel of Rachel Cusk's trilogy, than for that of Karl Ove Knausgaard's My Struggle series.

Reviews of Kudos, the last novel of Cusk's trilogy, were largely positive. Writing for The New Yorker, Katy Waldman called it "a book about failure that is not, in itself, a failure. In fact, it is a breathtaking success."

Cusk’s novel Second Place was published in 2021. It is inspired by the memoirs of Mabel Dodge Luhan, who hosted D.H. Lawrence at her property at the Taos art colony in New Mexico, in 1924. In this work, Cusk’s experimentation with the form of the novel continued. Andrew Schenker, writing in the Los Angeles Review of Books, wrote: "If the Outline trilogy had seemed to push beyond the novel while still working within the form, then Second Place suggests that Cusk may have outgrown the genre entirely." Cleveland Review of Books reviewed the book, saying that "the narratorial absence is part of what compels one through the novels, for it acts like a filter, distilling all other people’s tales down to their most philosophically bare, their most ethically ambiguous, their most painfully isolated."

In 2015, The Almeida theatre commissioned and originally produced Cusk's adaption of Medea as Medea - Euripides, A New Version. In Cusk's adaptation, Medea does not murder her children. Reviewing Medea, the Financial Times commented: "Rachel Cusk is known as an unsparing writer in the territory of marital break-up".

Personal life
After a brief first marriage to a banker, Cusk was married to photographer Adrian Clarke, with whom she has two daughters. The couple separated in 2011. Their divorce became a major topic in Cusk's writings.

Cusk is married to retail consultant and artist Siemon Scamell-Katz. They live in London and Norfolk with Cusk's daughters. In 2021, the couple announced plans to move to Paris, a protest in part against the withdrawal of the United Kingdom from the European Union.

Bibliography
Novels
Saving Agnes (1993)
The Temporary (1995)
The Country Life (1997)
The Lucky Ones (2003)
In the Fold (2005)
Arlington Park (2006)
The Bradshaw Variations (2009)
The Outline Trilogy
Outline (2014)
Transit (2017)
Kudos (2018)
Second Place (2021)

Non-fiction
A Life's Work: On Becoming a Mother (2001)
The Last Supper: A Summer in Italy (2009)
Aftermath: On Marriage and Separation (2012)
Coventry: Essays (2019)
Theatre 
Medea, Euripides - A new Version, 2015, Commissioned by and originally produced at the Almeida theatre in London, UK.

Introductions and forewordsBonjour Tristesse by Françoise Sagan (Penguin, 2008)The Age of Innocence by Edith Wharton (Folio Society, 2009)The Rainbow by D. H. Lawrence (Vintage, 2011)Complete Stories by Kingsley Amis (Penguin Classics, 2011)

Awards and prizes
1993 Whitbread First Novel Award - Saving Agnes1997 Somerset Maugham Award - The Country Life2003 Whitbread Novel Award (shortlist) - The Lucky Ones2005 Man Booker Prize (longlist) – In the Fold2007 Orange Prize for Fiction (shortlist) - Arlington Park2014 Goldmiths Prize (shortlist)
2015 Folio Prize (shortlist)
2015 Bailey's Prize (shortlist)
2015 Scotiabank Giller Prize (shortlist)
2015 Governor General's Literary Award for Fiction (shortlist)
2016 Goldsmiths Prize (shortlist)
2017 Scotiabank Giller Prize (shortlist)
2018 Goldsmiths Prize (shortlist)
2021 Booker Prize (longlist) - Second Place2021 Governor General's Award for English-language fiction (shortlist) - Second Place2022 Prix Femina étranger - Second PlaceFurther reading
 "Suburban Worlds: Rachel Cusk and Jon McGregor." In B. Schoene. The Cosmopolitan Novel. Edinburgh University Press, 2009.

References

 External links 

 Elaine Blair in The New Yorker on Rachel Cusk and Outline''
 https://www.nytimes.com/2015/01/07/books/outline-rachel-cusks-new-novel.html
 http://www.sydneyreviewofbooks.com/outline-rachel-cusk/
 https://www.theatlantic.com/magazine/archive/2017/01/the-uncoupling/508742/
 https://www.thetimes.co.uk/article/aftermath-on-marriage-and-separation-by-rachel-cusk-xn0xgt0lsp9

1967 births
Living people
Alumni of New College, Oxford
English women novelists
Fellows of the Royal Society of Literature
20th-century English novelists
21st-century English novelists
Writers from Los Angeles
Writers from Saskatoon
Academics of Kingston University
20th-century English women writers
21st-century English women writers
Prix Femina Étranger winners